Professional Referee Organization (PRO) is the organization responsible for managing the referee and assistant referee program in professional soccer leagues in the United States and Canada, working alongside the United States Soccer Federation, Major League Soccer, the Canadian Soccer Association, the United Soccer League, the National Women's Soccer League, and the U.S. Open Cup.

The organization's targets are to increase the quality of officiating in U.S. and Canadian professional leagues, develop more professional-quality officials at a younger age, and produce officials who will represent the United States and Canada in FIFA competitions.

History
The U.S. Soccer Federation and Major League Soccer joined forces in 2012 to create the Professional Referee Organization and the aims for PRO is to develop a higher standard of officiating at a younger age and to produce referees who can represent the United States and Canada in FIFA competitions.

Then U.S. Soccer President Sunil Gulati said, "We've always understood that the development of referees is an important aspect to the growth of the game in the United States. PRO is another step toward the improvement and professionalization of our top referees. With the additional resources and funding provided by the formation of PRO, we will continue to build upon the progress we've already made."

Staff

Major League Soccer awards

USL Championship awards

Roster
As of February 2023, these match officials are listed on the PRO rosters.

Referees

  Mark Allatin
  Fotis Bazakos
  Allen Chapman
  Alex Chilowicz
 / Matthew Conger
 / Marcos DeOliveira
  Joe Dickerson
  Filip Dujic
  Ismail Elfath
  Drew Fischer
  Tim Ford
  Jon Freemon
  Guido Gonzales, Jr
  Pierre-Luc Lauziere
  Jair Marrufo
  Rosendo Mendoza
  Ismir Pekmic
  Chris Penso
  Tori Penso
  Michael Radchuk
  Victor Rivas
  Nima Saghafi
 / Robert Sibiga
  Kevin Stott
 / Lukasz Szpala
  Ramy Touchan
  Ted Unkel
  Rubiel Vazquez
  Armando Villarreal

Assistant referees

  Ian Anderson
  Lyes Arfa
  Kyle Atkins
  Peter Balciunas
  Micheal Barwegen
  Andrew Bigelow
  Cameron Blanchard
  Diego Blas
  Chantal Boudreau
  Logan Brown
  Jose da Silva
  Brian Dunn
  Chris Elliott
  Gianni Facchini
  Adam Garner
  Ryan Graves
  Jeffrey Greeson
  Jeremy Hanson
  Walt Heatherly
  Eduardo Jeff
  Jeremy Kieso
  Kevin Klinger
  Kevin Lock
  Felisha Mariscal
  Brooke Mayo
  Ian McKay
  Oscar Mitchell-Carvalho
  Meghan Mullen
  Matt Nelson
  Kathryn Nesbitt
  Corey Parker
  Ben Pilgrim
  Brian Poeschel
  Cory Richardson
  Corey Rockwell
  Mike Rottersman
  Kali Smith
  Jeffrey Swartzel
  Stefan Tanaka-Freundt
  Nick Uranga
  Chris Wattam
  Jason White
  Adam Wienckowski
  Tyler Wyrostek

Video assistant referees

  Malik Badawi
  David Barrie
  Carol Anne Chenard
  Geoff Gamble
  Jorge Gonzalez
  Luis Guardia
  Edvin Jurisevic
  Alejandro Mariscal
  Younes Marrakchi
  Daniel Radford
  José Carlos Rivero
  Sorin Stoica
  Kevin Stott
  Kevin Terry, Jr.

Assistant video assistant referees

  Claudiu Badea
  Jozef Batko
  Gjovalin Bori
  Jonathan Johnson
  Mike Kampmeinert
  Craig Lowry
  Jeffrey Muschik
  Rene Parra
  Josh Patlak
  Robert Schaap
  Thomas Supple
  Fabio Tovar
  Eric Weisbrod
  TJ Zablocki

International roster
As of February 2023, these officials' are on the international roster:

  Frank Anderson
  Lyes Arfa
  Kyle Atkins
  Micheal Barwegen
  Alexandra Billeter
  Cameron Blanchard
  Chantal Boudreau
  Logan Brown
  Allen Chapman
  Carol Anne Chenard
  Danielle Chesky
  Matthew Conger
  Jose Da Silva
  Ismail Elfath
  Drew Fischer
  Tim Ford
  Jennifer Garner
  Edvin Jurisevic
  Jeremy Kieso
  Katja Koroleva
  Pierre-Luc Lauziere
  Felisha Mariscal
  Samantha Martinez
  Brooke Mayo
  Alicia Messer
  Meghan Mullen
  Kathryn Nesbitt
  Alyssa Nichols
  Corey Parker
  Tori Penso
  Salma Perez
  Cory Richardson
  Victor Rivas
  Corey Rockwell
  Nima Saghafi
  Natalie Simon
  Kali Smith
  Tiffini Turpin
  Nick Uranga
  Rubiel Vazquez
  Armando Villarreal
  Chris Wattam

International appointments
In December 2018, Jair Marrufo as referee, Frank Anderson and Corey Rockwell as assistant referees, and Mark Geiger as an assistant video assistant referee, were selected to oversee the 2018 FIFA Club World Cup Final.

In June 2019, Ismail Elfath as referee, Kyle Atkins and Corey Parker as assistant referees, and Alan Kelly as the video assistant referee were assigned to the 2019 FIFA U-20 World Cup Final.

See also
 Select Group

References

External links
 

Association football referees
American soccer referees
Canadian soccer referees
 
United States Soccer Federation
Sports professional associations
Sports organizations established in 2012
2012 establishments in North America